The 2004 European Mountain Running Championships were held in Korbielów, Poland.

Results

Men

Women

References

External links
 European Mountain Running Championships History at EAA

European Mountain Running Championships
European Mountain Running Championships
2004 in Polish sport
2004 in European sport
International athletics competitions hosted by Poland